Helicina schereri is a species of tropical land snail with an operculum, a terrestrial gastropod mollusk in the family Helicinidae.

Distribution
This species lives in Brazil.

References

Helicinidae
Gastropods described in 1914